Hapoel Haifa Football Club is an Israeli football club located in Haifa. During the 2017-18 campaign they will be competing in the following competitions:Israeli Premier League, State Cup, Toto Cup Ligat Al.

Club

Kits

 Provider: Diadora
 Main Sponsor: MMM It's Good
 Secondary Sponsor:  Moked Hat'ama

Squad information

Transfers

Transfers in

Pre-season and friendlies

Competitions

Overview

Ligat Ha'Al

Results summary

Results by matchday

Regular season

Regular season table

Results overview

Play-off

Relegation round table

Results overview

Cup

Round of 32

Round of 16

Toto Cup

Group stage

Quarter final

Statistics

Appearances and goals

|-
|colspan="12"|Players away from Hapoel Haifa on loan:
|-

|-

|-

|-

|-
|colspan="12"|Players who appeared for Hapoel Haifa  that left during the season:
|-

|-

|-

|-

|-

|}

Goalscorers

Last updated: 16 May 2016

Assists

Last updated: 16 May 2016

Clean sheets

Updated on 16 May 2016

Disciplinary record

Updated on 16 May 2016

Suspensions

Updated on 21 May 2018

Penalties

Updated on 16 May 2016

Overall

{|class="wikitable" style="text-align: center;"
|-
!
!Total
!Home
!Away
!Natural
|-
|align=left| Games played          || 41 || 20 || 21 || -
|-
|align=left| Games won             || 10 || 7 || 3 || -
|- 
|align=left| Games drawn           || 14 || 5 || 9 || -
|-
|align=left| Games lost             || 17 || 8 || 9 || -
|-
|align=left| Biggest win             ||  3 - 0 vs Hapoel Acre || 3 - 0 vs Hapoel Acre || 3 - 2 vs Hapoel Acre || -
|-
|align=left| Biggest loss       || 1 - 4 vs Hapoel Ironi Kiryat Shmona || 1 - 4 vs Hapoel Ironi Kiryat Shmona || 2 - 3 vs Maccabi Haifa || -
|-
|align=left| Biggest win (League)    ||  2 - 0 vs Bnei Sakhnin2 - 0 vs Maccabi Netanya ||  2 - 0 vs Bnei Sakhnin2 - 0 vs Maccabi Netanya || 3 - 2 vs Hapoel Acre || -
|-
|align=left| Biggest loss (League)   || 1 - 4 vs Hapoel Ironi Kiryat Shmona || 1 - 4 vs Hapoel Ironi Kiryat Shmona || 2 - 3 vs Maccabi Haifa || -
|-
|align=left| Biggest win (Cup)    || 3 - 1 vs Maccabi Jaffa || 3 - 1 vs Maccabi Jaffa || - || -
|-
|align=left| Biggest loss (Cup)     || 0 - 1 vs Maccabi Haifa || - || 0 - 1 vs Maccabi Haifa || -
|-
|align=left| Biggest win (Toto)    || 3 - 0 vs Hapoel Acre || 3 - 0 vs Hapoel Acre || - || -
|-
|align=left| Biggest loss (Toto)   || 1 - 2 vs Maccabi Haifa || 0 - 1 vs Hapoel Ironi Kiryat Shmona || 1 - 2 vs Maccabi Haifa || -
|-
|align=left| Goals scored           || 48 || 25 || 23 || -
|-
|align=left| Goals conceded         || 55 || 26 || 29 || -
|-
|align=left| Goal difference        || -7 || -1 || -6 || -
|-
|align=left| Clean sheets            || 8 || 5 || 3 || -
|-
|--
|-
|align=left| Yellow cards          || 85 || 42 || 43 || -
|-
|align=left| Red cards               || 6 || 4 || 2 || -
|-
|align=left| Most appearances      ||colspan=4|  Tadas Kijanskas,  Bruno Pinheiro (37)
|-
|align=left| Most goals        || colspan=4|  Mahran Lala (11)
|-
|align=left| Most Assist        || colspan=4|  Hanan Maman (7)
|-
|align=left| Penalties for   || 4 || 3 || 1 || -
|-
|align=left| Penalties against   || 4 || 3 || 1 || -
|-
|align=left| Winning rate         || % || % || % || -
|-

References

Hapoel Haifa
Hapoel Haifa F.C. seasons